A tertiary referral hospital (also called a tertiary  hospital, tertiary referral center,  tertiary care center, or tertiary center) is a hospital that provides tertiary care, which is a level of health care obtained from specialists in a large hospital after referral from the providers of primary care and secondary care. Beyond that general definition, there is no precise narrower or more formal definition, but tertiary centers usually include the following:

a major hospital that usually has a full complement of services including pediatrics, obstetrics, general medicine, gynecology, various branches of surgery and psychiatry or
a specialty hospital dedicated to specific sub-specialty care (pediatric centers, oncology centers, psychiatric hospitals).  Patients will often be referred from smaller hospitals to a tertiary hospital for major operations, consultations with sub-specialists and when sophisticated intensive care facilities are required.

Some examples of tertiary referral center care are:

 Head and neck oncology
 Perinatology (high-risk pregnancies)
 Neonatology (high-risk newborn care)
 PET scans
 Organ transplantation
 Trauma surgery
 High-dose chemotherapy for cancer cases
 Growth and puberty disorders
 Neurology and neurosurgery
 In the UK, cases of poisoning.

See also
 History of hospitals
 Secondary hospital
 Hospital train
 Hospital ship
 Underground hospital

References

Types of hospitals